James Lundie may refer to:
 James Lundie (footballer)
 James Lundie (minister)